Bernice Fenwick Martin (July 7, 1902 – 1999) was a Canadian painter and printmaker known for her landscapes.

Biography
Bernice Fenwick Martin was born July 7, 1902 in Shelburne, Ontario. She began her art studies at Toronto Technical Schools. She continued her education throughout the 1920s and 1930s at the Ontario College of Art. Her teachers included John William Beatty and Group of Seven painter Franklin Carmichael.

In 1941 Martin met the artist Peter Clapham Sheppard and the two were sketching companions until Sheppard's death in 1965.

From 1945 to 1947 Martin's work was included in the Royal Canadian Academy of Arts exhibitions. She held one woman shows at Eaton's College Street Fine Art Galleries in Toronto, at the Casa Loma also in Toronto, and at the Hamilton Art Gallery. One of her prints is in the National Gallery of Canada.

Martin was a member of the Society of Canadian Painter-Etchers and Engravers, and the Print and Drawing Council of Canada.

Martin died in 1999 in Toronto.

References

1902 births
1999 deaths
20th-century Canadian women artists
20th-century Canadian painters
Canadian women painters
Artists from Ontario
People from Dufferin County